The McCarthyites were a short-lived anti-Catholic and anti-French-Canadian political movement which contested the 23 June 1896 federal election in Canada.

Dalton McCarthy was the only "McCarthyite" to win election (he contested and won two seats), and the movement disbanded in 1898, not long after his death.

Formation and political platform 
Dalton McCarthy, an Irish-born lawyer, had been elected as a Conservative in Simcoe North in the 1872 election, and was re-elected in every subsequent election. In 1891, McCarthy left the Conservative Party after disagreements with its leader, John A. Macdonald, and ran and won as an independent.

McCarthy was notoriously anti-Catholic and anti-French-Canadian. He was a founder of the Canadian branch of the Imperial Federation League, a group that sought to unite Britain and its colonies and dominions in a trans-global federation.

McCarthy also appears to have been associated with the Equal Rights Party, although did not run under its banner in the 1891 election.

The 1896 election 
In 1896, McCarthy and nine of his supporters presented themselves for election in ridings in Ontario and Manitoba. At the time, candidates could present their names for election in more than one riding at a time.

McCarthy sought election and won in both Simcoe North, Ontario, and Brandon, Manitoba. Having won re-election in Simcoe North, McCarthy resigned the Brandon seat.

McCarthyite candidates polled second in three other ridings, Lanark South, Hastings North and Durham East, scoring over 40% of the vote in each case.

In Muskoka and Parry Sound, the McCartyite candidate won 20.1% of the vote in a three-way race. In the other ridings, the McCarthyites did poorly, winning about 10% of the vote or less.

Across all ridings, McCarthyites collected a total of 12,861 votes, or 28.1% of the popular vote.

Post-election 

As the only elected McCarthyite, Dalton McCarthy forged an alliance with Wilfrid Laurier's Liberals.  He would likely have been appointed to cabinet had he not died following a carriage accident in early 1898. His son, Leighton McCarthy, won a by-election to succeed his father.

His followers attempted to revive the party and pursue McCarthy's anti-Catholic theme, but were unsuccessful. The party was formally disbanded in the same year.

External links 
 Parliament of Canada History of the Federal Electoral Ridings since 1867

See also
List of political parties in Canada

Federal political parties in Canada